Peter A. Wegner (August 20, 1932 – July 27, 2017) was a computer scientist who made significant contributions to both the theory of object-oriented programming during the 1980s and to the relevance of the Church–Turing thesis for empirical aspects of computer science during the 1990s and present. In 2016, Wegner wrote a brief autobiography  for Conduit, the annual Brown University Computer Science department magazine.

Education
Wegner was educated at University of Cambridge and received a Post-Graduate Diploma in Numerical Analysis and Automatic Computing in 1954, at a time when there were no PhD programs in computer science. He was awarded a PhD from the University of London in 1968 for his book Programming Languages, Information Structures, and Machine Organization, with Maurice Wilkes listed as his supervisor.

Research
The seminal work in the area of object-oriented programming is On Understanding Types, which was co-authored with Luca Cardelli. On relevance of the Church–Turing thesis, he co-authored several papers and co-edited a book Interactive Computation: the New Paradigm, which was published in 2006.

Awards
Wegner was inducted as a Fellow of the Association for Computing Machinery (ACM) in 1995 and received the ACM Distinguished Service Award in 2000. In 1999, he was awarded the Austrian Cross of Honor for Science and Art, 1st class ("Österreichisches Ehrenkreuz für Wissenschaft u. Kunst I. Klasse"), but was hit by a bus and sustained serious brain injuries when on a trip to London to receive his award. He recovered after a lengthy coma.

He was the editor-in-chief of ACM Computing Surveys and of The Brown Faculty Bulletin. He was a professor at Brown University.

References

1932 births
2017 deaths
Alumni of the University of London
American computer scientists
Austrian computer scientists
Programming language researchers
Fellows of the Association for Computing Machinery
Recipients of the Austrian Cross of Honour for Science and Art, 1st class
Brown University faculty